The VK 36.01 (H) was an experimental German heavy tank, developed during World War II. The VK 36.01 H was further development of the VK 30.01 (H) experimental medium tank, and subsequently lead to the development of the VK 45.01 (H).

There were only 8 chassis and one complete prototype built, all by Henschel. At the time Henschel was assigned with developing a breakthrough weapon that would help defeat the Soviet Union. Other experimental heavy tanks and super-heavy tanks were built, designed, and tested by Henschel. The development of the VK 36.01 (H) lead to the development of the VK 45.01 (H), the prototype immediately preceding, and approved for production into, the Tiger I.

References 

Heavy tanks of Germany